Hanna Klaus is an Obstetrics and gynaecology physician, a member of the Medical Mission Sisters, and best known as founder of the TeenSTAR adolescent sex education program.

Klaus was born in 1928 in Vienna, Austria, to a Jewish family, moving to the United States in 1940 and settling in Louisville, Kentucky. Klaus studied medicine at University of Louisville and then conducted her residency at Massachusetts General Hospital. In 1978 she became an associate professor of obstetrics and gynecology at George Washington University.

In 1980 Klaus founded TeenSTAR, as well as acting as the executive director of the Natural Family Planning Center in Bethesda, Maryland.

Klaus promoted the Billings ovulation method, a type of natural family planning which is approved by the Catholic Church. In 1973 she founded the Aware Center, which provided information on the Billings method. The Billings method began to gain recognition in the scientific community, and a study was carried out on its effectiveness in Kenya.

Publications

References

External links
TeenSTAR

1928 births
Living people
University of Louisville School of Medicine alumni
Jewish emigrants from Austria to the United States after the Anschluss
20th-century American physicians
American women physicians
American obstetricians
Women gynaecologists
American gynecologists
George Washington University faculty
American sex educators